Roger Meyer Temam  (born 19 May 1940) is a French applied mathematician working in numerical analysis, nonlinear partial differential equations and fluid mechanics. He graduated from the University of Paris – the Sorbonne in 1967, completing a doctorate under the direction of Jacques-Louis Lions. He has published over 400 articles, as well as 12 (authored or co-authored) books.

Scientific work 
The first work of Temam in his thesis dealt with the fractional steps method. Thereafter, "he has continually explored and developed new directions and techniques": 
 calculus of variations, and the notion of duality, developing the mathematical framework for discontinuous (in displacement) solutions; a concept later used for his works on the mathematical theory of plasticity;
 mathematical formulation of the equilibrium of a plasma in a cavity, expressed as a nonlinear free boundary problem;
 Korteweg–de Vries equation;
 Kuramoto–Sivashinsky equation;
 Euler equations in a bounded domain;
 infinite-dimensional dynamical systems theory. In particular, he studied the existence of the finite-dimensional global attractor for many dissipative equations of mathematical physics, including the incompressible Navier–Stokes equations. He was also the co-founder of the notion of inertial manifolds together with Ciprian Foias and George R. Sell and of exponential attractors together with Alp Eden, Ciprian Foias and Basil Nicolaenko;
 optimal control of the incompressible Navier–Stokes equations as a tool for the control of turbulence;
 boundary layer phenomena for incompressible flows.

Temam's main activities concern the study of geophysical flows, the atmosphere and oceans. This started in the 1990s by collaboration with Jacques-Louis Lions and Shouhong Wang.

Of all mathematics advisors recorded by the Mathematical Genealogy Project database, Temam has the second-largest number of doctoral students.  More than 30 of his students are now full professors all over the world, and have themselves many descendants.

Administrative activities
Temam became a professor at the Paris-Sud University at Orsay in 1968. There, he co-founded the Laboratory of Numerical and Functional Analysis which he directed from 1972 to 1988.

In 1983, Temam co-founded the French Société de Mathématiques Appliquées et Industrielles (SMAI), analogous to the Society for Industrial and Applied Mathematics (SIAM), and served as its first president. He was also one of the founders of the International Congress on Industrial and Applied Mathematics (ICIAM) series and was the chair of the steering committee of the first ICIAM meeting held in Paris in 1987; and the chair of the standing committee of the second ICIAM meeting held in Washington, D.C., in 1991. He was the Editor-in-Chief of the mathematical journal M2AN from 1986 to 1997.

Temam has been the Director of the Institute for Scientific Computing & Applied Mathematics (ISCAM) at Indiana University since 1986 (co-director with Ciprian Foias from 1986 to 1992). He is also a College Professor (part-time till 2003) and he has been a Distinguished Professor since 2014.

Books

Awards and honors
 Fellow of the American Academy of Arts and Sciences (2015), of the American Mathematical Society (2013), of the American Association for the Advancement of Science (2011), of the Society for Industrial and Applied Mathematics (2009).
 Knight of the Legion of Honor, France, 2012. 
 Member of the French Academy of Sciences since 2007.

References

External links
Roger Temam's publications at Google Scholar

University of Paris alumni
Indiana University faculty
Academic staff of Paris-Sud University
Fluid dynamicists
Living people
20th-century French mathematicians
21st-century French mathematicians
Fellows of the American Mathematical Society
Fellows of the Society for Industrial and Applied Mathematics
Members of the French Academy of Sciences
1940 births
Variational analysts